Shanawas Prem Nazir is an Indian actor who appears in Malayalam film . He is the son of legendary Malayalam actor Prem Nazir (Evergreen Hero of Malayalam Cinema). He has acted in more than 50 Malayalam films.

Background
Shanawas was born at Thiruvananthapuram, as the son of Prem Nazir and his wife Habeeba Beevi. He has three sisters. He had his primary education from Chirayakeezhu English Medium School, Montfort School, Yercaud and pursued master's degree in English literature from The New College, Chennai.  He made his debut through Premageethangal, a Malayalam movie in 1981. He made his comeback through the 2011 Malayalam movie, China Town.

Family
Shanawas is settled in Malaysia. Shanawas's wife Ayisha beevi is the daughter of the eldest sister of Prem Nazir, Late Suleikha Beevi. The couple have two sons Shameer Khan and Ajith Khan. Shameer tried his luck in Malayalam movie Uppukandam Brothers Back in Action but was unsuccessful and is now working as a Manager and Vlogger in Malaysia. Ajith Khan is working in Australia.

Selected filmography

Television
 Shankupushpam (Asianet)
Kadamattathu Kathanar (Asianet)
Ammathottil (Asianet)
Vikramadithyan (Asianet)
Veluthakathreena/Kanalpoovu (Kairali TV)
Summer in America (Kairali TV)
Sathyameva Jayathe (Surya TV)
Manasariyathe (Surya TV)

References

External links

http://cinidiary.com/peopleinfo.php?pigsection=Actor&picata=1&no_of_displayed_rows=3&no_of_rows_page=10&sletter=S
http://www.mallumovies.org/artist/shanawas
http://www.malayalamcinema.com/star-details.php?member_id=339
http://www.malayalachalachithram.com/movieslist.php?a=6873
Shanawas at MSI

Indian male film actors
Male actors from Thiruvananthapuram
Male actors in Malayalam cinema
Living people
20th-century Indian male actors
21st-century Indian male actors
Indian male television actors
Male actors in Malayalam television
1955 births